Morgan Murphy (born October 23, 1981) is an American stand-up comedian, comedy writer, and actress. She has performed in the Comedians of Comedy tour and appeared in the Comedians of Comedy: Live at the Troubador DVD. Bobcat Goldthwait cast her in the films Sleeping Dogs Lie and World's Greatest Dad. She has also been a featured performer for all three years of Aimee Mann's "Christmas Spectacular" tours and appeared in the video for Mann's song "31 Today". Morgan has made numerous appearances on Jimmy Kimmel Live!, for which she also worked as a writer.

Life and career
She was one of the original writers on Late Night with Jimmy Fallon, writing and appearing in comedy segments on the show from its debut in 2009 until her departure in March 2011. The writing staff of the show was nominated for a Primetime Emmy Award in 2011. In 2014, she appeared on WTF with Marc Maron, and discussed her relationship with the host Marc Maron.

As of 2012, she has been a writer on 2 Broke Girls and has appeared on-camera in the episode "And the Drug Money", credited as "Sedate Girl". She also made a stand-up special for Netflix in 2013 called Irish Goodbye.

Murphy was raised Jewish by her mother, but did not have a bat mitzvah. She attended Jesuit High School in Beaverton, Oregon.

Discography
 Irish Goodbye 2014 CD/Download (New Wave Dynamics)

Filmography

Films
 Sleeping Dogs Lie aka Stay 2006 - Linda
 World's Greatest Dad 2009 - Morgan
 The Goods: Live Hard, Sell Hard 2009 - Karaoke Bartender
 It's Kind of a Funny Story 2010 - Joanie
 God Bless America 2011 - Fast Food Employee
 Who the F#ck Is Chip Seinfeld? 2011 - Morgan Murphy

Documentary
 Warren Ellis: Captured Ghosts 2011 - herself

Shorts
 Sheep Man 2006 - Wilma Vadins

Home Videos
 The Comedians of Comedy 2007 - DVD chapter: "Comedians To Pay Attention To" (Anchor Bay Entertainment)
 The Comedians Of Comedy (Live At The Troubadour) 2007 - DVD chapter: 9 (Image Entertainment)
 2 Broke Girls: 2 Broke Girrrlllss with Sophie Kachinsky 2013 - DVD extra
 2 Broke Girls: Max's Homemade Cupcakes - Go Big or Go Broke 2013 - DVD extra

Television

Movies
 The Offensive Show 2003 - writer
 Hackett 2008 - untitled role

Series
Actor
 The Lady Policeman 2005 - Co-co (Channel 101 web series)
 Yacht Rock 2005 - Rosanna Arquette (Channel 101 web series)
 Samantha Who? 2008 - Woman Protester
 2 Broke Girls 2012 - Sedate Girl
 Drunk History 2014 - Narrator
 The Jim Gaffigan Show 2015 - Morgan Murphy
Writer/Producer
 Jimmy Kimmel Live! 2003-2006 - writer (338 episodes)
 Crank Yankers 2005 - writer (22 episodes)
 Human Giant 2007-2008 - consultant, writer (3 episodes)
 Shutterbugs 2008 - consultant writer (1 episode)
 Reality Bites Back 2008 - consulting producer (8 episodes)
 Late Night with Jimmy Fallon 2009-2011 - writer (411 episodes)
 Nick Swardson's Pretend Time 2011 - writer (1 episode)
 2 Broke Girls 2012-2016 - producer (90 episodes), story editor (20 episodes), writer (11 episodes)
 Downward Dog 2017 - co-executive producer (7 episodes), writer (1 episode)
 Roseanne 2018 - consulting producer (9 episodes), writer (1 episode) 
 Modern Family 2019-2020 - co-executive producer, actress, writer (20 episodes)
 Abbott Elementary 2021-2022 - writer (2 episodes)

Specials
 Morgan Murphy: Irish Goodbye 2013 Netflix special, 2014 streaming (also writer, executive producer)
Appearances
 Hilarity for Charity 2016 2016 (also writer)
 Doug Stanhope: The Comedians' Comedian's Comedians 2017 (also writer)
Consultant only
 2007 MTV Movie Awards 2007
 Guys Choice 2007
 Cheech & Chong: Roasted 2008

Stand-Up and Interview Appearances
1 episode each, except where noted
 Funny Money 2003
 Premium Blend 2004-2005 (2 episodes)
 Jimmy Kimmel Live! 2004-2009 (7 episodes)
 Last Call with Carson Daly 2006
 CH Live: NYC 2009 (short)
 Late Night with Jimmy Fallon 2009-2011 (9 episodes)
 The Kevin Nealon Show 2010
 Red Eye 2011
 Chelsea Lately 2012-2014 (10 episodes)
 The Fogelnest Files 2013
 John Oliver's New York Stand-Up Show 2013
 Getting Doug with High 2014-2015 (3 episodes)
 Baby Talk 2015
 @midnight 2015-2017 (4 episodes)
 The Joe Rogan Experience 2016-2017 (2 episodes)

References

External links

Morgan Murphy profile, ComedyCentral.com 
Morgan Murphy interview, youtube.com
Live at Comix episode, wtfpod.com

1981 births
Living people
21st-century American comedians
21st-century American screenwriters
Actresses from Portland, Oregon
American film actresses
American stand-up comedians
American television actresses
American television writers
American women comedians
American women television writers
Jesuit High School (Beaverton, Oregon) alumni
Jewish American actresses
Jewish American female comedians
Jewish American writers
Jewish American comedians
Loyola Marymount University alumni
Screenwriters from Oregon
Writers from Portland, Oregon
21st-century American actresses
21st-century American Jews
21st-century American women writers